is a national university located in Tokyo, Japan. It has campuses in Kunitachi, Kodaira, and Chiyoda. One of the top 9 Designated National University in Japan, Hitotsubashi is a relatively small institution specialized solely in social sciences with about 4,500 undergraduate students and 2,100 postgraduate students.

Established in 1875 by Mori Arinori and evolved from Tokyo College of Commerce, Hitotsubashi has been consistently ranked amongst the top universities in Japanese university rankings and considered the best in economics and commerce related subjects in Japan. It was ranked 25th in the world in 2011 by Mines ParisTech: Professional Ranking of World Universities.

Hitotsubashi has strong relationships with overseas universities. There are around 600 international students and 450 researchers from abroad under academic exchange agreements with 83 universities and research institutions, including University of Chicago, the University of Oxford and the University of California.

The university's symbol is inspired by Mercury, Roman mythology's god of commerce.

History

The last Shogun Tokugawa Yoshinobu, prior to the end of his reign, sent Eiichi Shibusawa to Europe during the 1860s, where he learned of their advanced banking and economic system and brought it back to modernize Japan. The school expanded gradually with the support of Eiichi Shibusawa and Takashi Masuda and other influential individuals. Shibusawa is regarded as the father of the modern Japanese economy. Eiichi Shibusawa and Tokugawa Yoshinobu's son, Tokugawa Iesato worked together to established a number of large business enterprises, as well as academic institutions and other social service agencies which still active today, while Masuda was the founder of Mitsui & Co Shogun Tokugawa Yoshinobu was the head of the Hitotsubashi family, and that may well be why in 1949, the school adopted the name of Hitotsubashi University.

There were talks about a merger with The University of Tokyo, but alumni and students objected—the merger was not fulfilled. This is known as the "Shinyu Incident".

 1875: Arinori Mori established Institute for Business Training (商法講習所|Shōhō Kōshūjo) at Ginza-owarichō, Tokyo.
 1884: became a national school under the direct supervision of the Ministry of Agriculture and Commerce of Japan, and changed its name to the Tokyo Commercial School (東京商業学校|Tokyo Shōgyō Gakkō).
 1885: came under the control of the Ministry of Education, Science and Culture of Japan, and absorbed the Tokyo Foreign Language School. The school then relocated to the site of the latter institution in an education district called Hitotsubashi, Tokyo in the vicinity of the Imperial Palace.
 1887: the status of the Tokyo Commercial School was raised to that of the Higher Commercial School (高等商業学校|Kōtō Shōgyō Gakkō).
 1897: established affiliated institutions for foreign-language education.
 1899: separated affiliated institutions for foreign-language education as Tokyo School of Foreign Languages (now Tokyo University of Foreign Studies).
 1902: changed its name to the Tokyo Higher Commercial School (東京高等商業学校|Tōkyō Kōtō Shōgyō Gakkō) due to the establishment of another such school in Kansai district (now Kobe University).
 1920: raised to and became the Tokyo College of Commerce (東京商科大学|Tōkyō Syōka Daigaku).
 1927: moved to Kunitachi and Kodaira, Tokyo, its present location, on account of the Great Kanto earthquake.
 1944: changed its name to the Tokyo College of Industry (東京産業大学|Tōkyō Sangyō Daigaku) under the order of the Ministry of Education, Science and Culture of Japan.
 1947: changed its name back to the Tokyo College of Commerce (東京商科大学|Tōkyō Syōka Daigaku).
 1949: adopted the new system and the name of Hitotsubashi University (一橋大学|Hitotsubashi Daigaku) through a student ballot, when the American education system was introduced as part of the postwar education reforms, and established Faculties of Commerce, Economics, and Law & Social Sciences.
 1951: separated Faculty of Law & Social Sciences into Faculty of Law and Faculty of Social Science.
 1996: established the Graduate School of Language and Society.
 1998: established the Graduate School of International Corporate Strategy (ICS).
 2004: established Law School due to the introduction of Law School system in Japan.
 2005: established School of International and Public Policy.
 2023: established School of Social Data Science & Graduate School of Social Data Science

Faculties and graduate schools

Hitotsubashi University has about 4,500 undergraduate and 2,100 postgraduate students with some 630 faculty members.

Undergraduate programs
 Commerce (275)
 Economics (275)
 Law (175)
 Social Sciences (235)

Graduate programs
 Commerce (Master Program: 108, Doctor Program: 30)
 Economics (Master Program: 70, Doctor Program: 30)
 Law (Master Program: 15, Doctor Program: 26 Juris Doctor Program: 100)
 Social Sciences (Master Program: 87, Doctor Program: 44)
 Language and Society (Master Program: 49, Doctor Program: 21)
 International Corporate Strategy (ICS) (including MBA Program)
 International and Public Policy (55)

Parentheses show the numbers of admitted students per year.

Research institutes and centers

 Institute of Economic Research
 Research Center for Information and Statistics of Social Science
 Center for Economic Institutions
 Center for Intergenerational Studies
 Research and Development Center for Higher Education
 Information and Communication Technology Center
 Center for Student Exchange
 International Joint Research Center
 Institute of Innovation Research
 Center for Historical Social Science Literature

Academic exchange agreements overseas
As of 2007, Hitotsubashi University had academic exchange agreements with 84 overseas universities and research institutions, including those between departments and departments, as follows:

Academic rankings

Hitotsubashi University is considered one of the most prestigious universities in Japan, consistently ranking amongst the top universities in Japanese university rankings. It is one of the highest ranked national universities that is not one of the National Seven Universities.

Hitotsubashi is a specialized institution only in social science, thus it is not as well known as other big universities such as University of Tokyo and Kyoto University. Although it has only social science departments and the place in the university rankings is always underrated, the reputation is very high. Consequently, its outstanding position in Japan can be seen in the several rankings below.

General rankings
The university was ranked 7th out of 181 major universities in 2011 in the ranking called "Truly strong universities (本当に強い大学)" by Toyo Keizai. In this ranking, Hitotsubashi is 1st in average graduate salary.

According to QS World University Rankings, Hitotsubashi was ranked 314th, 314th, 420th, 378th and 365th in the world during 2005–2009. It has been ranked 114th, 101st, 99th and 178th during 2007–2010 in its social science ranking.

Research performance
The Weekly Diamond reported that Hitotsubashi has the 4th highest research standard in Japan in research funding per researcher in COE Program. In the same article, it is ranked seventh in quality of education by GP funds per student.

The economics department especially has a high research standard. According to the Asahi Shimbun, Hitotsubashi was ranked 4th in Japan in economic research during 2005–2009. More recently, Repec in January 2011 ranked Hitotsubashi's Economic Department as Japan's 5th best economic research university. Currently three researchers in Hitotsubashi are listed as top 10% economists in its world economist rankings. Hitotsubashi has provided seven presidents of the Japanese Economic Association in its 42-year history; this number is the second largest.

Asahi Shimbun summarized the number of academic papers in Japanese major legal journals by university, and Hitotsubashi was ranked 7th during 2005–2009.

Graduate school rankings
Hitotsubashi Law School is considered one of top law schools in Japan, as it was ranked No. 1 in the passing rate of Japanese Bar Examination in 2006, 2008 and 2009. On average, Hitotsubashi Law School was 1st out of all the 74 law schools in Japan according to the ratio, 81.50%, of the successful graduates who passed the bar examinations from 2007 to 2017.　In 2019, Hitotsubashi Law School became 2nd out of all the 72 law schools in Japan according to the ratio, 59.82%, of the successful graduates who passed the bar examination.

Hitotsubashi Business School is ranked 2nd in Japan by Nikkei Shimbun.
Eduniversal ranked Japanese business schools and Hitotsubashi was ranked 3rd in Japan (100th in the world). In this ranking, Hitotsubashi is one of three Japanese business schools categorized in "Universal business schools with major international influence". It is one of the few Japanese business schools teaching in English.

Alumni rankings
Hitotsubashi alumni are distinctively successful in Japanese industries such as shown below.

According to the Weekly Economist 2010 rankings and the President'''s article on October 16, 2006, graduates from Hitotsubashi have the best employment rate in 400 major companies; the average graduate salary is the second best in Japan.年収偏差値・給料偏差値ランキング（2006・10・16）：稼げる大学はどれ？. Hensachi-ranking.seesaa.net (1999-02-22). Retrieved on 2013-08-23. Mines ParisTech : Professional Ranking World Universities ranks Hitotsubashi University as 25th in the world in 2011 in the number of alumni listed among CEOs in the 500 largest worldwide companies, although Hitotsubashi is small compared to other Japanese universities in the ranks.

The university is ranked 8th in Japan for the number of alumni holding executive positions in the listed companies of Japan, and this number per student (probability of becoming an executive) is 2nd in Japan.役員輩出率 大学ベスト30. Ranking100.web.fc2.com. Retrieved on 2013-08-23.

Popularity and selectivity
Hitotsubashi is one of the most selective universities in Japan. Its entrance difficulty is usually considered one of the most difficult, alongside University of Tokyo, Kyoto University and Tokyo Institute of Technology among 180 national and public universities. Japanese people call them as "tokyoikko(東京一工)" They are one of the most difficult universities for Japanese people to enter them. Universities in Japan are ranked based on a hensachi score. This tells how far from the statistical mean a typical student admitted to a university scores on a test. A score of 50 is at the mean. It is generally believed that the best universities have the highest hensachi score. These universities are ranked 1st to 4th place. So high school students have to get highest  hensachi score to enter them.

E.g. Yoyogi seminar published Hensachi (the indication showing the entrance difficulties by prep schools) rankings Japanese journalist Kiyoshi Shimano ranks its entrance difficulty as SA (most selective/out of 11 scales) in Japan. 

Evaluation from Business World

Notable faculty
Tsuru Shigeto: ex-president of Hitotsubashi University
J. Mark Ramseyer: ex-adjunct instructor, Mitsubishi professor of Japanese Legal Studies of Harvard Law School
Ikujiro Nonaka: Professor Emeritus, a member of Japan Academy, director of Seven & I Holdings Co., director of Mitsui & Co.
Kotaro Suzumura: Professor Emeritus, Person of Cultural Merit
Fumio Hayashi: professor, foreign honorary member of the American Academy of Arts and Sciences
Takeshi Mizubayashi: professor of Graduate School of Law
Irmela Hijiya-Kirschnereit: ex-professor, Faculty of Social Sciences
Hirotaka Takeuchi: professor emeritus
Joseph Schumpeter: visiting professor in 1931

Notable alumni

The university's alumni association is called Josuikai (如水会) and its main building (Josui Kaikan) is next to the building where Graduate School of International Corporate Strategy (ICS) is in Kanda, Tokyo.

 World leaders 

 The 68th and 69th Prime Minister of Japan Masayoshi Ōhira (1978-1980)
 The 4th Prime Minister of South Korea Baek Du-jin (1952-1953)
 The 20th Prime Minister of Mongolia Rinchinnyamyn Amarjargal (1999-2000)

Other politicians
Shōzō Murata: ex-Minister of Japanese Government Railways, ex-Minister of Communications of Japan, president of Osaka Shosen Kaisha (now Mitsui O.S.K. Lines)
Paek Nam-un: ex-Chairman of the Supreme People's Assembly, ex-Minister of Education (North Korea)
Aziz Abduhakimov:current Deputy Prime Minister of the Republic of Uzbekistan
Michio Watanabe: ex-Vice Prime Minister of Japan, ex-Minister of Finance (Japan), ex-Foreign Minister of Japan
Shinzō Ōya: ex-Ministry of Commerce and Industry (Japan), ex-Minister of Finance (Japan)
Zentaro Kosaka: ex-Minister for Foreign Affairs (Japan)
Kumakichi Nakajima: ex-Ministry of Commerce and Industry (Japan)
Koji Omi: ex-Minister of Finance (Japan)
 Tetsuo Kondo: ex-Minister of Labour
Saburō Eda: ex-Chairman of Japan Socialist Party
Shintarō Ishihara: author, ex-Governor of Tokyo, ex-Minister of Transportation
Tsunei Kusunose: former Governor of Hiroshima Prefecture
Yasuo Tanaka: author and former Governor of Nagano Prefecture
Katsutoshi Kaneda: current Minister of Justice (Japan)
Naoki Minezaki:ex-Senior Vice Minister of the Ministry of Finance (Japan)
Yoshitake Kimata: ex-Chairman of Committee on Economy, Trade and Industry
Shigeyuki Tomita: ex-State Secretary for Foreign Affairs of Japan, ex-Senior Vice Minister of the Ministry of Justice (Japan)
Hajime Seki: ex-mayor of Osaka City
Taizō Mikazuki: current Governor of Shiga Prefecture, ex-Senior Vice-Minister of Land, Infrastructure, Transport and Tourism
Takashi Kawamura: current mayor of Nagoya City
Zenjiro Kaneko: ex-Parliamentary Secretary for Health, Labour and Welfare of Japan
Koichiro Ichimura: ex-Parliamentary Secretary for Land, Infrastructure and Transport of Japan
Asahiko Mihara: ex-Parliamentary Vice‐Minister of Defense of Japan
Yoshinori Suematsu: ex-Senior Vice-Minister of the Cabinet Office (Japan)
Sumiko Takahara: ex-chief of the Economic Planning Agency
Leong Mun Wai: Singaporean politician
Togmidyn Dorjkhand: Mongolian politician

Diplomats
Kōichirō Asakai: Ex-Japan's ambassador to the United States
Katsuji Debuchi: Ex-Japan's ambassador to the United States
Saburō Kurusu: Imperial Japan's Ambassador to Germany
Naotake Satō: Ex-President of House of Councillors of Japan, Ex-Foreign Minister of Japan
Toshikazu Kase: Japan's first Ambassador to the United Nations
Mami Mizutori: Special Representative of the Secretary-General for Disaster Risk Reduction in the UNDRR
Ichiro Komatsu: Ex-Director-General of the Cabinet Legislation Bureau, Ex-Japan's Ambassador to France
Kenichi Itō: Ex-CEO of The Japan Forum on International Relations
Makoto Taniguchi: Ex-Japan's Ambassador to the United Nations, Ex-Chairman of UNICEF
Yukio Okamoto: Diplomatic advisor and analyst
Maria Zeneida Collinson: The President of the 61st International Atomic Energy Agency (IAEA) General Conference
Umarjadi Notowijono: The 2nd Secretary-General of ASEAN, Indonesia's first Ambassador to the United Nations

Judges, bureaucrats
Harumi Takahashi: current governor of Hokkaidō Prefecture
Kei Komuro: lawyer, husband of former Japanese princess Mako Komuro
Yoshihiro Yasuda: lawyer
Saburo Tokura: The 20th Chief Justice of Japan

Industry
Fusanosuke Kuhara: entrepreneur, politician and cabinet minister in the pre-war Empire of Japan, founder of Kuhara Zaibatsu
Masaru Hayami: Ex-Governor of the Bank of Japan, Ex-CEO of Nissho Iwai Corp.
Kenkichi Kagami: Ex-chairman of Tokio Marine & Fire Insurance Co., Ltd., Ex-President of Mitsubishi Bank, Ltd. 
Rizaburo Toyoda: first President of Toyota Motor
Kizo Yasui: former Chairman of Toray Industries, Inc., former vice-chairman of Nihon Keidanren (Japan Business Federation)
Hiroshi Okuda: Ex-Chairman of Toyota Motor and Chairman of Nihon Keidanren (Japan Business Federation)
Otogo Kataoka: first President of Nomura Securities Co., Ltd.
Kunio Egashira: Ex-Chairman of Ajinomoto Co., Inc.
Taikichiro Mori: founder of Mori Building (Forbes ranked him as the richest man in the world in 1991 and 1992.)
Masaaki Tsuya: CEO of Bridgestone Co., Inc.
Hiroshi Mikitani: founder and CEO of Rakuten Group, Inc.
Tatsumi Kimishima: current President of Nintendo, former CEO and Chairman of Nintendo of America
Hidesaburō Shōda: Ex-CEO of Nisshin Seifun Group, father of the Empress Michiko
Masatsugu Nagato: current CEO of Japan Post Holdings, former CEO of Japan Post Bank, former Chairman of Citibank Japan
Noritoshi Kanai: Ex-Chairman of Mutual Trading Co., Inc.

Academia
Tokuzō Fukuda: Economist, Professor Emeritus at Tokyo College of Commerce
Eiichi Sugimoto: Economist
Ichiro Nakayama: Economist, President of the Tokyo College of Commerce, the first Chairman of The Tax Commission of Japan
Heizō Takenaka: Economist, former Minister of State for Economic and Fiscal Policy of Japan, Professor at Keio University
Hiroko Ōta: Economist, Professor of National Graduate Institute for Policy Studies, Ex-Minister of State for Special Missions of Japan
Hiroshi Mizuta:Economist, Professor Emeritus at Nagoya University and a member of the Japan Academy
Ryuzo Sato: Economist, C.V. Starr Professor of Economics at New York University
Thomas T. Sekine: Economist, Professor at York University
Takatoshi Ito: Economist, Professor of School of International and Public Affairs, Columbia University, Ex-Deputy Vice Minister of Finance for International Affairs
Kotaro Suzumura: Economist, Person of Cultural Merit, Professor Emeritus at School of Political Science and Economics, Waseda University, Professor Emeritus at Hitotsubashi University
Seiichiro Yonekura: Economist, Professor at Hitotsubashi University and Hosei University, Director of Nippon Genki Juku
Tran Van Tho: Economist, Professor of School of Social Sciences, Waseda University
Takashi Hikino: Economist, Associate Professor of Graduate School of Economics, Kyoto University
Yoshinori Fujikawa: Economist, Associate Vice President at Hitotsubashi University
Hideroku Hara: Legal Scholar, Professor Emeritus at Shiga University
Mau-sheng Lee: Professor of College of Law, National Taiwan University
Hisashi Inoue: Historian, Professor at Surugadai University
David Toshio Tsumura: Linguist, Old Testament scholar, Dean of Faculty and professor at Japan Bible Seminary
Noriko H. Arai: Mathematician, professor at the National Institute of Informatics

Others
Stephen Fumio Hamao: Cardinal of the Roman Catholic Church
Adebayo Alonge: Nigerian pharmacist
Aya Domenig: filmmaker (Als die Sonne vom Himmel fiel'') of Japanese–Swiss origin.
Kiyoshi Nishimura: filmmaker
Sumio Kobayashi: composer
Akira Kume: actor
Hiroshi Koike: playwright
Tamotsu Nakamura: explorer, Fellow of the Royal Geographical Society
Seiichiro Kashio: athlete, Silver Medalist of men's tennis doubles in 1920 Summer Olympics
Masaji Kiyokawa: athlete, Gold Medalist of backstroke in 1936 Summer Olympics, Ex-Vice Chairman of International Olympic Committee, Ex-CEO of Kanematsu Corp.
Shinpei Mykawa: rice farmer who introduced rice farming to an area of Texas; he came from a college that became Hitotsubashi University
Zenzo Shimizu: athlete, tennis player
Hiroshi Nakano: rower
Ryuta Arakawa: rower
Masabumi Hosono: the only Japanese passenger on the RMS Titanics disastrous maiden voyage
Hyozo Omori: physical education specialist
Kichimatsu Kishi: "Baron Kishi", oil developer in the U.S.
George Shima: "The Potato King", the first President of the Japanese Association of America
Futabatei Shimei: author, translator
Kafū Nagai: author
Christian Polak: author
Takashi Hiraide: poet
Wataru Yoshizumi: Manga artist
Iō Kuroda: Manga artist
Ken Ishii: musician
Yoshiki Mizuno: musician, member of Ikimono-gakari
Ichiro Yoshizawa: mountaineer
Junpei Yasuda:journalist
Riko Muranaka:medical doctor and journalist
Yoshiharu Sekino: explorer, surgeon
Dan Weiss:former Head coach of the Tokyo Excellence
Kenji Tokitsu: practitioner of Japanese martial arts
Yasusato Gamō: educator
Kenkichi Ueda: Imperial Japan's Governor-General of Kwantung

References

External links

 Hitotsubashi University
 Graduate School of International Corporate Strategy (ICS) Hitotsubashi University

 
Educational institutions established in 1875
Japanese national universities
1875 establishments in Japan
American football in Japan
Kunitachi, Tokyo
Kanda, Tokyo
Kodaira, Tokyo